J.M. Ritchie may refer to:

 James Ritchie (rugby union) (1907–1942), Scottish rugby union player
 James M. Ritchie (1829–1918), American politician
 James Martin Ritchie (1917–1993), chairman of Bowater's
 Jim Ritchie (1907–1981), New Zealand businessman and Anglican church administrator
 Jim Ritchie (* 1929 in Montreal), Canadian sculptor